Ingemar Düring (2 September 1903 - 23 December 1984) was a Swedish Classical Philologist. From 1945 to 1970 he was a professor at Gothenburg University.
His most notable work is Aristotle in the Ancient Biographical Tradition

References

1903 births
1984 deaths
Swedish philologists
Academic staff of the University of Gothenburg
20th-century philologists